Abd al-Aziz ibn Marwan ibn al-Hakam (died 12 May 705) was the Umayyad governor and de facto viceroy of Egypt between 685 and his death. He was appointed by his father, Caliph Marwan I (r. 684–685). Abd al-Aziz's reign was marked by stability and prosperity, partly due to his close relations and reliance on the Arab military settlers of Fustat. Under his direction and supervision, an army led by Musa ibn Nusayr completed the Muslim conquest of North Africa. He was removed from the line of succession to the caliphal throne and, in any case, died before his brother, Caliph Abd al-Malik. However, one of Abd al-Aziz's sons, Umar II, would become caliph in  717.

Early life and career
Abd al-Aziz was the son of a prominent Umayyad statesman, Marwan ibn al-Hakam, and one of his wives, Layla bint Zabban ibn al-Asbagh of the Banu Kalb tribe. Abd al-Aziz may have visited Egypt when the province was governed by Maslama ibn Mukhallad al-Ansari (667–682), the appointee of Mu'awiya I, founder of the Umayyad Caliphate. In 682, Abd al-Aziz was part of an embassy, alongside his elder half-brother Abd al-Malik, sent by Marwan to the anti-Umayyad rebel Abd Allah ibn al-Zubayr in Mecca. When the people of Medina, home to the Umayyad family, rebelled against Mu'awiya's successor, Caliph Yazid I, and besieged the Umayyads in 683, Abd al-Aziz is not mentioned as being present. The historian Wilhelm Barthold speculates he could have been in Egypt at the time.

Ibn al-Zubayr declared himself and gained wide recognition as caliph after the death of Yazid in 683. In the summer of 684, when Marwan was elected caliph by pro-Umayyad loyalist tribes in Syria, chief among them the Banu Kalb, Abd al-Aziz was in his father's company. He fought alongside his father and the Banu Kalb against the supporters of Ibn al-Zubayr in Syria, al-Dahhak ibn Qays al-Fihri and the Qays tribes, at the subsequent Battle of Marj Rahit near Damascus in August. Abd al-Aziz was thrown off his horse during the battle, which ended in a crushing Umayyad–Kalbite victory. Afterward, he played a leading role in Marwan's conquest of Egypt from its Zubayrid governor Ibn Jahdam al-Fihri, serving as the commander of a contingent which crossed into the province through the Sinai Peninsula, via the Red Sea port town of Ayla. There, he confronted Ibn Jahdam and his deputy Zuhayr ibn Qays al-Balawi, with the latter later defecting to Abd al-Aziz. After Marwan returned to Syria, he designated Abd al-Malik as his successor, to be followed by Abd al-Aziz. Abd al-Malik acceded as caliph upon Marwan's death in April 685.

Governor of Egypt
Abd al-Aziz is most notable for his twenty-year-long tenure as governor (āmīr) of Egypt, from 685 CE (AH 65) until his death in 705 CE (AH 86). He was placed in the post by Marwan after the Marwan departed Egypt for Syria in February 685. He enjoyed wide autonomy in the governance of Egypt, and functioned as a de facto viceroy of the country. Abd al-Aziz also supervised the completion of the Muslim conquest of North Africa; he appointed Musa ibn Nusayr to his post as governor of Ifriqiya.

Foundation of Hulwan and building works in Fustat
During the early years of his reign, Abd al-Aziz resided chiefly at Fustat, leaving it only for two visits to the Caliph's court at Damascus and four visits to Alexandria. Fustat was the capital of the province, established in the 640s by the Arab conqueror and first governor of Islamic Egypt, Amr ibn al-As. Abd al-Aziz was a major patron of architectural projects and his rule marked the heyday of Umayyad-era building works in the city. Several houses, palaces, roofed markets and fountains were built under his direction.

Abd al-Aziz completely rebuilt and expanded the Mosque of Amr, Fustat's congregational mosque. To its west, in 686/87 he erected the Dar al-Mudhahabba (the Gilded Palace). The residential complex was also known in the contemporary Arabic sources as al-Madina (the City), giving an indication of its size, covering up to  including gardens.  The complex included some buildings of at least two storeys. It overlooked the Nile and likely included the house and surrounding land of the high-ranking official Kharija ibn Hudhafa (d. 661), which Marwan purchased from Kharija's son for 10,000 gold dinars.  

According to the historian Wladyslaw Kubiak, the Dar al-Bayda (the White Palace) built by Marwan in Fustat may have been viewed by Abd al-Aziz as unsuitable for a person of his rank and the new palace became the official residence of Egypt's Marwanids (descendants of Caliph Marwan). He built a bath in the city named after his son Zabban, upon whom it was bestowed.  The bath became the subject of a celebrated verse: Whoever has in his soul a place for white, let him have that white in the Bath of Zabban  It has no breath, no eyelashes, however, it is an idol in the creation of man.

At least four roofed markets, each specialising in a type of merchandise, were built during Abd al-Aziz's reign. In August/September 688, he also built the Qantara bridge over the Khalij Amir al-Mu'minin (Canal of the Commander of the Faithful), which passed through Fustat and connected Heliopolis (Ayn Shams) to the Nile. The bridge, located in the Hamra al-Quswa neighborhood, was likely meant to serve a major circulatory road in Fustat and its remains were still visible in the 12th century. It was one of a number of bridges constructed in the city by Abd al-Aziz.

The foundation of Hulwan began a custom of establishing "satellite residence town[s]", which was "repeated countless times by later rulers in various regions of the Islamic world", according to Kubiak.

Abd al-Aziz constructed in Hulwan a mosque, a number of churches (see below) and palaces, and planted vineyards and palm trees. He erected a nilometer in the new city, although it was replaced by the nilometer built on the Nile river island of al-Rawda in 715. Hulwan was well known for the glass pavilions patronised by the governor and an artificial lake fed by an aqueduct. The city's prosperity under Abd al-Aziz was praised by the poet Ubayd Allah ibn Qays al-Ruqayyat.

Domestic affairs
Abd al-Aziz proved to be a capable governor, and his rule was a period of peace and prosperity, marked by his conciliatory and co-operative attitude towards the leaders of the local Arab settlers (the jund). Throughout his tenure, Abd al-Aziz relied on them rather than the Syrians, who elsewhere were the main pillar of the Umayyad regime.

Abd al-Aziz was known for his generosity. The 10th-century Egyptian historian al-Kindi quotes a report that he arranged for one thousand bowls of food to be set up around his palace and had another one hundred bowls supplied to the tribal settlers of Fustat, both on a daily basis. These bowls are also mentioned in a well-known eulogy by Ibn Qays al-Ruqayyat:

That is Laylā's son, Abd al-'Azīz: at Bābilyūn [Babylon Fortress] his food bowls are full to overflowing.

According to al-Kindi, Abd al-Aziz introduced an Islamic ritual in Egypt consisting of a sitting held in the mosques during afternoon prayers on the ninth day of Dhu al-Hijjah, the Day of Arafa. Abd al-Aziz opposed a higher tax burden on indigenous Muslim converts. He had been called on by Abd al-Malik to follow the example of the caliph's governor of Iraq and the eastern Caliphate, al-Hajjaj ibn Yusuf, who imposed the poll tax (jizya) on the inhabitants of his province even after their conversion to Islam. Instead, Abd al-Aziz took the advice of the qadi (chief Islamic judge) and treasurer of Egypt, Abd al-Rahman ibn Hubayra, and did not implement the measure.

The medieval Egyptian historian Ibn Abd al-Hakam (d. 971) relates that Abd al-Aziz had a different copy of the Qur'an produced from the version of al-Hajjaj, which had been sent to him. The revised version was said to have contained grammatical corrections and was inherited, in succession, by Abd al-Aziz's son Abu Bakr, and then Abd al-Aziz's daughter Asma and son al-Hakam.  The Baghdad-based writer Abu Ubayd Allah al-Marzubani (d. 995) praised Abd al-Aziz for promoting the Arabic language.  Having caused misunderstandings by his own erroneous pronunciation of Arabic, Abd al-Aziz endeavoured to learn the correct pronunciation and later made gifts to his petitioners dependent on their mastery of the Arabic language.

Relations with Christians
According to the 10th-century Melkite Christian patriarch Eutychius of Alexandria, Abd al-Aziz permitted his Melkite servants to establish a small church in Hulwan dedicated to Saint George. One of the governor's Jacobite secretaries, Athanasios, was also allowed to construct a church in close proximity to the Babylon Fortress (Qasr al-Sham) in the vicinity of Fustat.

Apart from personal favours to the Christians in his circle, Abd al-Aziz pursued a restrictive policy towards Egypt's indigenous Christian population. In 693/94, on one of his visits to Alexandria, he arrested the Christian leaders of the city and dispersed them across the country's villages and rural districts. He then obliged each district to pay taxes according to the yield of its fields and gardens. Abd al-Aziz had his son al-Asbagh take a census of all the monks of the province, imposed on each of them a poll tax—from which they had previously been exempted—of one gold dinar, and forbade the recruitment of new monks. He also closely monitored the elections of the Coptic patriarchs and obliged the patriarchs to take their seat in Hulwan. The public display of Christian symbols was banned, and a Christian source reports that Abd al-Aziz had all the crosses in Egypt destroyed.

Death and legacy
Marwan had named Abd al-Aziz his second heir after Abd al-Malik. The latter, however, wanted his son al-Walid I to succeed him, and Abd al-Aziz was persuaded not to object to this change. In the event, Abd al-Aziz died on 12 May 705 CE (13 Jumada I AH 86), four months before Abd al-Malik. Abd al-Aziz was succeeded as governor by Abd al-Malik's son Abdallah, whose aim was to restore the caliphate's control over the province and, in the words of the historian Hugh N. Kennedy, "remove all traces of Abd al-Aziz's administration".

By dint of his major architectural works in Fustat and Hulwan, roughly coinciding with the period of monumental Islamic architecture's earliest stages under the caliphs Abd al-Malik and al-Walid I, Kubiak calls Abd al-Aziz perhaps "the true father of Islamic architecture". His patronage activities initiated a trend continued by later governors and caliphs. Though he spent large sums in the course of his rule, Abd al-Aziz's personal lifestyle was austere. At his death, he left the relatively small fortune of 7,000 gold dinars (according to his treasurer) and tattered clothing. In an indication of his piety, he stated on his deathbed his wish to have been a mere cameleer roaming the Hejaz (western Arabia), a man of no consequence or a collection of dust.

Family and descendants
According to the historian Ibn Sa'd (d. 845), Abd al-Aziz had children from three wives and two slave women. Abd al-Aziz highly valued this marital link with the family of the former caliph and spent 400 gold dinars for the wedding. While Ibn Sa'd counts four sons from Umm Asim—Asim, Umar II, Abu Bakr and Muhammad—al-Baladhuri and Ibn Abd al-Hakam count two: Abu Bakr Asim and Umar II. Twelve years after Abd al-Aziz's death, Umar II was appointed caliph and ruled until 720. 

From another wife, Umm Abd Allah bint Abd Allah, a granddaughter of Amr ibn al-As, Abd al-Aziz had his sons Suhayl and Sahl and daughters Sahla and Umm al-Hakam. From a third wife, Layla bint Suhayl, he had his daughter Umm al-Banin. Abd al-Aziz was also married to Hafsa, a daughter of Asma bint Abd al-Rahman ibn al-Harith of the prominent Qurayshite clan of Banu Makhzum.

Five of his children, including his eldest son al-Asbagh, were born to slave women. According to the Egyptian historian al-Kindi (d. 961), Abd al-Aziz appointed al-Asbagh as a temporary governor of Alexandria and, during Abd al-Aziz's visit to Syria in 695, as his place-holder over the whole of Egypt. Abd al-Aziz intended that al-Asbagh—for whom he nurtured hopes in the caliphal succession—would succeed him as governor of Egypt, making the province into a hereditary appendage for his household, but al-Asbagh died a few months before Abd al-Aziz. 

Other sons of Abd al-Aziz from his slave women included Zabban and Juzayy. The latter was one of the first Umayyads to relocate to al-Andalus (the Iberian Peninsula, where an Umayyad emirate was established in 756) in the aftermath of the Abbasid Revolution in 750, moving soon after the fall of the last Umayyad caliph, Marwan II. Juzayy died in 757 and left several descendants in Cordoba. Descendants of Zabban established themselves in Niebla and one of them developed the Suwayqat al-Zabbaniyyin square in Cordoba. Ibn Abd al-Hakam notes a third slave woman, of Greek or Coptic origin, named Maria, with whom Abd al-Aziz had a son named Muhammad. In honour of Maria, Abd al-Aziz built a palace in Fustat called Qasr Mariya (Maria's Palace).

Abd al-Aziz's descendants remained influential in Egyptian affairs until the early Abbasid period. Abd al-Aziz's grandsons Muhammad and Amr, both sons of Sahl, are mentioned several times in the traditional Islamic sources, and Amr was counted among the supporters of the Alid rebel Abdallah ibn Muawiya when the latter fled Merv for Egypt in 747. 

In the immediate aftermath of the Abbasid Revolution, Abd al-Aziz's grandson Umar ibn Suhayl and great-grandson Isa ibn al-Walid ibn Umar were deported to Qalansuwa from Egypt and executed, while his grandsons Marwan ibn al-Asbagh, Abd al-Malik ibn Abi Bakr and al-Asbagh ibn Zabban were killed in the massacre of the Umayyad family at Nahr Abi Futrus. His grandsons Asim and Umar (both sons of Abu Bakr) and Asim's sons, Maslama, Aban and Abd al-Malik, found safety with Coptic villagers in Upper Egypt but were pardoned by the Abbasid governor Salih ibn Ali and returned to Fustat. A great-grandson of Abd al-Aziz, al-Asbagh ibn Sufyan ibn Asim, supported the Abbasid caliph al-Mansur in Egypt, and another great-grandson, Dihya ibn Mus'ab ibn al-Asbagh, led a revolt in the country against Caliph al-Hadi.

References

Bibliography

Primary sources

Secondary sources

Further reading
Mabra, Joshua. Princely Authority in the Early Marwānid State: The Life of ʿAbd al-ʿAzīz ibn Marwān (d. 86/705). Gorgias Press: Piscataway, NJ, 2017. 

7th-century births
705 deaths
7th-century Umayyad governors of Egypt
8th-century Umayyad governors of Egypt
Sons of Umayyad caliphs
Umayyad governors of Egypt
Heirs apparent who never acceded
7th-century Arabs
8th-century Arabs
City founders
People of the Second Fitna